USS Connecticut may refer to the following ships that were operated by the United States:

  was a gundalow that served with the Continental Army during the American Revolutionary War
  served during the Quasi-War
  was a sidewheel steamer launched in 1861 and in service during the American Civil War
 USS Pompanoosuc, a screw steamer whose building began in 1863, was renamed Connecticut on 15 May 1869, but never launched; broken up in 1884
  was a monitor renamed during construction and commissioned as USS Nevada
  is the second  currently in service

United States Navy ship names